The 2030 FIFA World Cup will be the 24th FIFA World Cup, a quadrennial international football tournament contested by the men's national teams of the member associations of FIFA. The event will mark the centennial of the first World Cup.

Host selection
The first proposed bid for the 2030 World Cup was by joint bid from the Argentine Football Association and Uruguayan Football Association. The second was by The Football Association of England. On 8 October 2020, the Royal Spanish Football Federation and the Portuguese Football Federation confirmed that the two countries would be putting forward a joint Iberian bid to host the World Cup. It was officially presented on 4 June 2021. Under FIFA rules as of 2017, the 2030 World Cup cannot be held in Asia (AFC) or in North America (CONCACAF), following the selection of Qatar for 2022, and Canada, Mexico and the United States for 2026.

The joint bid by Argentina and Uruguay was announced on 29 July 2017. Before a match between Uruguay and Argentina in Montevideo four weeks later, Uruguay's Luis Suárez and Argentina's Lionel Messi – then teammates at FC Barcelona – promoted the bid with commemorative shirts. On 31 August, it was suggested that Paraguay would join as a third host. CONMEBOL, the South American confederation, confirmed the joint three-way bid in September. The Uruguay–Argentina–Paraguay bid would coincide with the centennial anniversary of the first FIFA World Cup final hosted by Uruguay as well as the bicentennial of the first Constitution of Uruguay. On 14 February 2019, Chile revealed their plans to join the three confirmed countries in hosting the tournament. Chile was accepted in the bid and will become the first-ever quartet to bid for the World Cup.

In 2015, vice-chairman of The Football Association David Gill stated that his country could potentially bid for 2030, provided that the bidding process was made more transparent. Journalist Ben Rumsby wrote, "England is one of few countries that could stage even a 48-nation event in its entirety, while Football Association chief executive Martin Glenn made it clear earlier that year bidding for 2030 was an option." In June 2017, UEFA's president Aleksander Čeferin stated that Europe (UEFA) would definitely fight for its "turn" to host the World Cup in 2030. The same month, UEFA stated that "it would support a pan-British bid for 2030 or even a single bid from England."

The bidding timeline was announced by the FIFA Council at their meeting in Shanghai, China, on 24 October 2019. The bidding process was launched in 2022 with bid regulations for approval in June 2023 and the host to be chosen by the FIFA Congress in the third quarter of 2024.

Potential bids

African bids
On 17 June 2018, the Royal Moroccan Football Federation announced its co-bidding for the 2030 World Cup. There were two possible joint bids: one with Tunisia and Algeria, and another with Spain and Portugal, which they would later join.

On 10 July, Egypt's Sports Minister expressed interest in bidding to host.

On 29 September, the executive board of the Union of North African Football Federations (UNAF) announced its interest in submitting a joint North African bid for the 2030 World Cup.

In July 2019, Egyptian Football Association president Hany Abo Rida said Egypt would be ready to host a 48-team World Cup.

Cameroonian then-presidential candidate Joshua Osih's political program included nominating his country along with two sub-Saharan African countries to host the 2030 World Cup. Interest had been thought to be high among many sub-Saharan African countries with the most likely being the Republic of the Congo, the Democratic Republic of the Congo, Gabon, the Central African Republic, Nigeria or Angola to join Cameroon in bidding for the 2030 World Cup. At the 2018 Cameroonian presidential election, Osih lost to re-elected long-time incumbent Paul Biya.

European bids

Southeastern Europe
On 2 November 2018, the leaders of Bulgaria, Greece, Romania and Serbia confirmed their intention to compete to host the tournament considering a combined bid. On 25 February 2019, it was officially confirmed that Romania, Bulgaria, Serbia and Greece would submit joint candidacy for the organisation of the UEFA Euro 2028 and the 2030 World Cup. The ministers signed a memorandum of understanding on 10 April. The project has been quietly abandoned, mainly due to Greece bidding with Egypt and Saudi Arabia.

United Kingdom and Ireland joint bid
On 17 June 2018, England's The Football Association announced that they were in talks with home nations over a UK-wide bid to host the 2030 World Cup. On 1 August, it was reported that the FA was preparing a bid for England to host the World Cup in 2030. A decision was expected to be made in 2019, after the FA conducted a feasibility study on a potential bid. UEFA President Aleksander Čeferin wanted only one European bid to host the World Cup. He also considered the British bid as the wisest idea. There are also talks about the Football Association of Ireland joining a possible British bid. The Scottish Football Association considered the potential British bid as a great opportunity to get funds to renovate and redevelop Hampden Park in Glasgow, the Scotland national football team's home stadium. On 19 September, the Football Association of Ireland confirmed it joined the feasibility study for co-hosting the 2030 World Cup with England, Scotland, Wales and Northern Ireland. On 28 September, the then British Prime Minister Theresa May announced that the British Government would back any British and Irish FIFA World Cup bid. Furthermore, The Football Association and the Football Association of Wales confirmed that the five national governing bodies were in discussions about the feasibility of bidding to host the World Cup.

On 15 July, deputy leader of the UK Labour Party, Tom Watson, earlier said that he and his party backed a 2030 World Cup bid for the UK. On 16 July, the then British Prime Minister Theresa May expressed her support for the bid. Although there had been no prior discussion with the Football Association, the Scottish FA also expressed an interest in joining a Home Nations bid. Former Scottish First Minister Henry McLeish called on the Scottish government and the Scottish Football Association to bid for the 2030 World Cup with the other British nations.

On 1 March 2021, Prime Minister of the United Kingdom, Boris Johnson, expressed interest in the United Kingdom and the Republic of Ireland hosting this World Cup, with the Treasury expected to pump £2.8 million into a bid for 2030. Feasibility studies by the Irish government and the UK government (including the devolved governments of Northern Ireland, Scotland, and Wales) have subsequently been initiated.
Johnson added "We are very, very keen to bring football home in 2030." The football associations of the bidding nations issued a joint statement saying that they were delighted with the government's commitment to the bid.
Following scenes of crowd disorder at the UEFA Euro 2020 final between England and Italy held on 11 July 2021 at Wembley Stadium Boris Johnson reiterated his hope that the UK and Ireland could still host the 2030 World Cup.

On 5 January 2022, the five football associations announced a joint United Kingdom and Ireland bid for the Euro 2028, which made their own World Cup bid "unlikely to succeed" and rendered it doubtful. On 7 February, it was also announced that the 2030 bid would be abandoned and that the UK and Ireland would instead focus on a bid to host Euro 2028.

South American bids

Colombia–Ecuador–Peru
On 7 September 2019, the president of Ecuador Lenín Moreno proposed a joint bid for organising the 2030 World Cup alongside Colombia and Peru. On 14 September, the president of Colombia Iván Duque confirmed that Colombia would bid to host the World Cup along with Ecuador and Peru. He also claimed the president of Peru Martín Vizcarra said this World Cup was important.

Uruguay–Argentina–Chile–Paraguay
The intended bid had initially been shared between only Uruguay and Argentina. The intended bid followed an earlier web movement claiming that FIFA should give Uruguay hosting rights for the 100th anniversary of the first World Cup, which was held in Uruguay.

The Uruguay–Argentina intention to bid was officially confirmed on 29 July 2017 before Paraguay was confirmed as the third host on 4 October 2017. Chile confirmed their bid to host with the group on 14 February 2019 as a joint communique from the confirmed nations.

Asian bids
Current FIFA rules prevent Asian Football Confederation nations from hosting any World Cup until 2034, following the selection of Qatar for the 2022 event. Nevertheless, South Korea's President Moon Jae-in suggested in June 2017 that the 2030 World Cup be hosted by a Northeast Asian block including both South Korea and North Korea, saying it would improve relations in the region. Chung Mong-gyu, the head of the Korea Football Association, renewed the offer to the DPR Korea Football Association, the Chinese Football Association, and the Japan Football Association at the FIFA Congress in June 2018. President Moon discussed the proposal again with Infantino during the 2018 FIFA World Cup.

On 5 June 2019, FIFA President Gianni Infantino referred to the FIFA Council meeting in October 2019 when he was asked for an update on the rules and timeline for the bidding process adding "We'll also see if there can be a bid from China".

On 12 August 2021, it was reported that Football Australia had begun preliminary discussions with state-based major events officials, with Sydney 2000 Olympics bid chief Rod McGeoch beginning work on a bid. Brisbane will already host the 2032 Summer Olympics.

Possible cross-confederation bids

Egypt–Greece–Saudi Arabia bid
Saudi Arabia (an AFC member) has been linked with a bid to host the 2030 World Cup. Saudi Arabia has never hosted a World Cup before, however they will host the Asian Cup in 2027. It has been thought Saudi Arabia's bid would involve a co-host, with rumored possibilities including Morocco or Egypt (both CAF members who also have never hosted a World Cup before) or Italy (a UEFA member which previously hosted the World Cup in 1934 and 1990). However, recent rumours have suggested that Saudi Arabia would bid to host the World Cup with Egypt and Greece as co-hosts.

Spain–Portugal–Morocco
On 13 September 2018, Prime Minister of Spain Pedro Sánchez discussed the possibility of Spain bidding for the 2030 World Cup with FIFA President Gianni Infantino and Royal Spanish Football Federation (RFEF) President Luis Rubiales.

On 8 June 2019, Spain and Portugal expressed an interest about co-hosting the World Cup.
On 8 October 2020, Spain and Portugal confirmed that the two countries would be putting forward a joint bid to host the World Cup.

The RFEF and the Portuguese Football Federation (FPF) jointly announced their intentions to bid for the tournament during a goalless friendly match between the two countries' national teams on 7 October. Before another goalless friendly between the two teams on 4 June 2021 (which also marked the centenary of Portugal's first international fixture, against Spain) the agreement to jointly support a bid was formalised. The respective presidents of the RFEF and FPF, Luis Rubiales and Fernando Gomes, ratified the agreement on behalf of their respective federations. Also in attendance to support the bid were King of Spain Felipe VI, President of Portugal Marcelo Rebelo de Sousa, Prime Minister of Spain Pedro Sánchez, Prime Minister of Portugal António Costa, and multiple government ministers and officials from both countries.

On 5 October 2022, it was announced that Ukraine would join the co-host bid with Spain and Portugal. The bid was endorsed by Volodymyr Zelenskyy, the President of Ukraine. It was expected that if the bid was successful, Ukraine would host some of the group stage games. This would have been the second major football tournament had Ukraine co-hosted, the first being UEFA Euro 2012, which was co-hosted with Poland.

Ukraine would later leave the bid on 14 March 2023, being replaced by Morocco, which shares a maritime border with Spain. Like Ukraine, Morocco has previously hosted a major football tournament, that being the 1988 Africa Cup of Nations, as well as several installments of the 7-team FIFA Club World Cup.

Confirmed bids

CONMEBOL

 Uruguay,  Argentina,  Paraguay and  Chile

Inter-confederation

 Spain,  Portugal, and  Morocco

Inter-confederation 

 Egypt,  Greece and  Saudi Arabia

Abandoned bids
CAF

 Morocco

UEFA

 Romania,  Greece,  Bulgaria and  Serbia

  England,  Northern Ireland,  Scotland,  Wales and  Republic of Ireland

Notes

References

 
2030
2030 in association football
Scheduled association football competitions